Devonte Wallace (born December 21, 1991) is a Canadian football offensive tackle for the Toronto Argonauts of the Canadian Football League (CFL). He played college football at New Mexico State University for the New Mexico State Aggies.

Professional career

Miami Dolphins
On May 12, 2015, Wallace was signed as an undrafted free agent. On July 29, 2015, he was waived. On July 30, 2015, he was placed on injured reserve. On April 22, 2015, Wallace was waived.

Carolina Panthers
On July 28, 2015, Wallace was signed by the Carolina Panthers. On September 1, 2015, he was waived/injured. On September 2, 2015, he was placed on injured reserve after going unclaimed on waivers. On November 23, 2015, he was waived from injured reserve.

References

External links
Carolina Panthers bio 

1991 births
Living people
Players of American football from El Paso, Texas
New Mexico State Aggies football players
Sportspeople from El Paso, Texas
Carolina Panthers players
Miami Dolphins players
Toronto Argonauts players
American football offensive tackles
Canadian football offensive linemen
American players of Canadian football
African-American players of American football
21st-century African-American sportspeople